The Municipality of Ilhas (literally "Municipality of the Islands") was one of the two municipalities of Macau, along with the Municipality of Macau. Its organs were the municipal council (Câmara Municipal das Ilhas) and the municipal assembly (Assembleia Municipal das Ilhas) (Câmara Municipal das Ilhas Provisória and Assembleia Municipal das Ilhas Provisória after December 20, 1999). Per Law No. 17/2001, the two municipalities were abolished on December 31, 2001 and replaced by the Instituto para os Assuntos Cívicos e Municipais (Institute of Civic and Municipal Affairs) the following day.

Freguesias

See also
Municipality of Macau

References

External links
Law No. 17/2001 - Creation of the Civic and Municipal Affairs Bureau (in Chinese) (in Portuguese) - Dissolution of the Câmaras Municipal and Assembleias Municipal, and Establishment of Instituto para os Assuntos Cívicos e Municipais

Politics of Macau
Municipalities of Macau